Rush Hour is a 2006 Russian drama film directed by Oleg Fesenko based on the novel of the same name by Jerzy Stawiński.

Plot
Every morning successful advertising specialist Konstantin Arkhipov hurries to yet another meeting with the unknown — a project that promises career growth, voices of women calling and beckoning on the phone, a new secretary chosen up to high standards. However, during the mad run, Kostya Arkhipov has lost control of his own life. At work, constant squabbles and intrigues, the relationship with his wife - at a dead end, his beloved daughter has become self-absorbed, his mother has not spoken to him for a long time. In an effort to push back all the difficulties, he constantly flies somewhere and is terribly tired of such a rush. He even suffers from insomnia.

The crisis caused by the middle age coincides for the hero with an unpleasant discovery: after seeing the doctor's card in the course of a scheduled examination, the hero reads there that he has cancer and only a few months left to live. The prosperous life of an influential person comes to an end. Not because he made any decisions, but for the reason that his illness contributed to the fact that others have imposed these decisions on him. And when it turns out that the diagnosis was false - it becomes clear that the old life will not return.

Konstantin decides to do what he has not done, express everything he could not say, and, finally, live as the heart and conscience dictate.

Cast
Konstantin Khabensky — Konstantin Arkhipov
Anna Kovalchuk — Evgeniya Arkhipova
Andrey Merzlikin — Yura Smirnitskiy
Raisa Ryazanova — Antonina Arkhipova
Yekaterina Guseva — Kseniya Bazhenova
Olga Shuvalova (II) — Anya Arkhipova
Leonid Nevedomsky — Edouard Nikolaevich
Natalya Kruglova — Marina
Kristina Kuzmina — Violetta
Andrei Zibrov — Vitaliy Obukhov
Sergei Nikolaev (XI) — Sergei Rodnykh
Maria Zhiganova

References

External links

Russian drama films
Films about cancer
2006 drama films
2006 films